Fransmart is a franchise development company responsible for the growth of many restaurant brands. Founded in 2000, the company has corporate headquarters in Alexandria, Virginia and Irvine, California. Fransmart specializes in restaurant development and franchising of emerging brands.

Among Fransmart's most notable successes are Five Guys Burgers & Fries, Qdoba Mexican Grill, and zpizza. Fransmart formed FranInvest, a private equity firm, in 2013 to make early-stage investments in emerging restaurant concepts.

Dan Rowe, Fransmart's CEO, has served in this capacity since he founded Fransmart in 2000.

Work 

Fransmart's current and past portfolio brands have opened thousands of restaurants around the world. Fransmart primarily targets emerging restaurant concepts that have the potential for expansion. It serves area and master developers, chain operators, and high-net-worth individuals.

Services 
Fransmart's services include but are not limited to management advisory, franchise program development, franchise sales, development of an ideal franchisee profile, franchise lead generation & marketing, branding, compliance and legal, geographic growth strategy, unit economics, and franchise systems.

Past and current franchises

Fransmart is responsible for building out many emerging restaurant franchise brands, service brands, and retail brands from single units to multi-unit chains found throughout the world.

Non-food brands

 Golden Heart Senior Care
 Paymore

Food brands

Artichoke Basille's Pizza
Bob and Edith's
Café d'Avignon
Calii Love
Cauldron Ice Cream
Cook's Tortas
Curry Up Now
Five Guys Burgers & FriesIn 2002, Five Guys worked with Fransmart to expand its franchising expansion. In fact, the founder of Fransmart, Dan Rowe, was Five Guys first franchisee. In just a year and a half, permits were sold for over 300 locations making it the fastest growing restaurant chain in America. Five Guys currently has over 1,500 locations open throughout North America and the UK.
Greek From Greece Café Cuisine
The Halal GuysIn June 2014, Fransmart began representing the famous cult offering The Halal Guys, the food carts with the never-ending lines in New York City.
The Hummus and Pita
Ike's Love & Sandwiches
The Italian Place
Mamoun's FalafelFransmart began representing Mamoun's Falafel Restaurant in 2015.
MUTT'S Canine Cantina
Pi Pizzeria
The Pie Hole
Qdoba Mexican GrillDan Rowe, the founder of Fransmart began representing Z-Teca in 1998 and was one of the Brands that helped launch Fransmart in 2000.  The brand changed its name to Qdoba, even though Z-Teca was a made-up name, there were lawsuits made because the name was too similar to other brands and it infringed on their trade names.  In 2003 Qdoba was purchased by Jack in the Box for $45 million.
Rise Southern Biscuits and Righteous Chicken
SlapfishSlapfish is a seafood restaurant founded by celebrity chef Andrew Gruel and his partner Jethro Naude.
Taffer's Tavern
Wolfnights - The Gourmet Wrap

References

External links 
 Fransmart, LLC
 Fransmart Europe 

American companies established in 2000
2000 establishments in Virginia
Companies based in Alexandria, Virginia